Ole Juulson Kvale (February 6, 1869 – September 11, 1929) was a Lutheran Minister and U.S. Representative from Minnesota.

Background
Ole Juulson Kvale was born near Decorah, Iowa. He was one of six children born to Jule Qvale (1836-1918) and  Gro Qvale (1833-1910), both of whom were immigrants from Norway. He inherited his family name from the farm Kvåle in Vestre Slidre in the Valdres valley district. He attended rural schools in Winneshiek County, Iowa. He was graduated from Luther College in Decorah in 1890, from Luther Theological Seminary, in Minneapolis, Minnesota, in 1893 and from the University of Chicago in 1914. He was ordained to the Lutheran ministry in 1894 serving parishes in Orfordville, Wisconsin, from 1894 to 1917 and in Benson, Swift County, Minnesota. In 1917, he became the secretary of the Norwegian Synod.

Career
Kvale had been an unsuccessful candidate as an Independent Republican for election in 1920 to the 67th congress. He was elected as a Farmer-Labor candidate to the 68th, 69th, 70th, and 71st congresses and served from March 4, 1923, until his death.

Personal life
He was married to Ida Tonette (Simley) Kvale (1876-1926). They had six children including United States Representative Paul John Kvale. Ole Kvale died in a fire in his summer house near Otter Tail Lake, Minnesota, on September 11, 1929. His interment was in Benson Cemetery, Swift County, Minnesota.

Primary Source

See also

List of United States Congress members who died in office (1900–49)

References

External links
 

1869 births
1929 deaths
Members of the United States House of Representatives from Minnesota
University of Chicago alumni
American Lutherans
American people of Norwegian descent
Minnesota Farmer–Laborites
Luther College (Iowa) alumni
Farmer–Labor Party members of the United States House of Representatives
People from Winneshiek County, Iowa
People from Orfordville, Wisconsin
People from Benson, Minnesota